Sit-e Bandkharas (also Romanized as Sīt-e Bandkharas; also known as Sīt) is a village in Gafr and Parmon Rural District, Gafr and Parmon District, Bashagard County, Hormozgan Province, Iran. At the 2006 census, its population was 47, in 11 families.

References 

Populated places in Bashagard County